Kidaari is a 2016 Indian Tamil-language action-mystery film written and directed by Prasath Murugesan, starring Sasikumar and Nikhila Vimal in the lead roles. The film, which is also produced by Sasikumar, features Napoleon, Vela Ramamoorthy, Suja Varunee, O. A. K. Sundar, and Hareesh Peradi in supporting roles. Darbuka Siva composed the music, while S. R. Kathir handled the cinematography and Praveen Anthony handled the editing. This film released on 2 September 2016.

Plot 
In Sattur town, Kombaiah Pandian (Vela Ramamoorthy) is the local don and controls the entire town. Kidaari (Sasikumar) is Kombaiah’s loyal henchman who is ready to sacrifice his life for the sake of his boss. One day, Kombaiah is stabbed in his neck by someone, and the news comes as a shock to the entire town. Now, Kidaari sets stage to find the culprit behind the assault and lists out all the suspects. The movie goes into flashback mode, frequently detailing the rivalry between Kombaiah and each suspect. Finally, Kidaari finds out that Kombaiah’s brother in-law and close aide, Pulikutthi Pandian (O. A. K. Sundar), was responsible for the assault. Pulikutthi admits that Kombaiah was stabbed accidentally when Pulikutthi tried to safeguard him from Kombaiah. A flashback is shown detailing the rivalry between Kombaiah and his own son Nambi (Vasumithra).

Pulikutthi’s only daughter was married to Kombaiah’s son Nambi. Trouble erupts between Nambi and his father Kombaiah, which leads to Kombaiah killing his own son. This worries Pulikutthi as his daughter has become a widow because of Kombaiah. This was the reason for Pulikutthi’s anger over Kombaiah. Pulikutthi also discloses the truth to Kidaari about the death of his father Kottur Durai (Napoleon). Years back, Kotur Durai was a henchman to a politician named S. N. Kaalai (Hareesh Peradi), while Kombaiah was a sidekick to Kotur Durai. However, Kombaiah betrays and kills Kottur Durai and then Kaalai. He then stages a drama that Kaalai killed Kottur Durai and he had revenged by killing Kaalai, which helped him establish himself as a don in the town. Knowing this, Kidaari feels bad as Kombaiah’s affection towards him was fake. He visits him in the hospital and informs him that he had understood Kombaiah's true intentions. Kombaiah is saved but loses his speech, and Kidaari becomes the don of the town. Kidaari spares Kombaiah but has instigated a fear of death in his mind, which Kidaari thinks is a bigger punishment.

Cast 

Sasikumar as Kidari
Nikhila Vimal as Chembha
Napoleon as Kottur Durai
Vela Ramamoorthy as Kombaiah Pandian
O. A. K. Sundar as Pulikutthi Pandian
Hareesh Peradi as S. N. Kaalai
Suja Varunee as Loganayaki
Shobha Mohan as Kombaiah's wife
Vasumithra as Kombaiah's son
Naadodigal Gopal as Pulikutthi's brother
Mu Ramaswamy as Kombaiah's friend
Phathmen as Kadakkarai
Raam as Ananth Velankar
Deepa Shankar as Ponnamma
Thenali (Dindugal Thendral)
K. N. Kaalai
R. S. Sathish

Production 
Sasikumar began work on the film directed by Prasath Murugesan during March 2016 in Chennai. Sasikumar attained the title Kidaari from Samuthirakani, who had previously registered the title when making Kitna. The film was shot briskly over the month of May 2016, lasting 62 days in total, with the makers announcing that the film was entering its final phase during June 2016.

Soundtrack 
Darbuka Siva composed the soundtrack. One of the songs, "Vandiyila Nellu Varum", was earlier featured in the debut album of La Pongal, a musical project founded by Siva. The audio rights were bought by Think Music.

Reception 
Baradwaj Rangan wrote in The Hindu, "This murder mystery needed more than flavour. It needed focus."

Notes

References

External links 
 

2010s Tamil-language films
2016 films
Indian action films
Indian mystery films